Mountain ash may refer to:
 
 Eucalyptus regnans, the tallest of all flowering plants, native to Australia
 Mountain-ashes or rowans, varieties of trees and shrubs in the genus Sorbus

See also
 Mountain Ash, Rhondda Cynon Taf, a town in Wales
 Mountain Ash, Kentucky, a town in the USA